This is a complete list of publicly available Swiss aerial tramways (excluding other types of aerial lifts), according to official timetables 2004. Not all of them are open all year. Some of them are sections of aerial lift systems that consist also of other types of aerial lifts besides the tramway in this list. For example, the aerial tramway Blauherd - Rothorn is part of the Zermatt - Sunnegga - Blauherd - Rothorn system, its section Zermatt - Sunnegga being a funicular and Sunnegga - Blauherd a gondola lift.

Plan-Francey - Le Moléson
Col du Pillon - Glacier3000 (Diablerets)
Champéry - Planachaux
Dorénaz - Champex-d'Alesse
Les Attelas - Mont Gelé
Tortin - Col-des-Gentianes  
Col-des-Gentianes -Mont Fort
La Chaux - Col-des-Gentianes
Riddes - Isérables
Bottom of Grande Dixence Dam - Top of Grande Dixence Dam
Chalais - Vercorin
Zinal - Sorebois
Cry-d'Er - Bella Lui
Cabane-des-Violettes - Pointe de la Plaine Morte
Leukerbad - Gemmipass
Leukerbad - Rinderhütte
Turtmann - Unterems - Oberems
Gampel - Jeizinen
Raron - Eischoll
Raron - Unterbäch
Wiler - Lauchernalp
Stalden - Staldenried - Gspon
Kalpetran - Embd
Embd - Schalb
Zermatt - Furi - Trockener Steg - Klein Matterhorn
Furgg - Trockener Steg
Blauherd - Rothorn
Gornergrat - Hohtällli - Stockhorn
Hohtälli - Rote Nase
Gant-Hohtälli Aerial Tramway (94 metre tall aerial lift pylon)
Spielboden - Längfluh
Felskinn - Mittelallalin
Grindelwald - First
Saas Fee - Felskinn
Saas Grund - Hohsaas
Blatten - Belalp
Mörel - Greich - Riederalp
Betten Talstation - Bettmeralp (direct line)
Betten Talstation - Betten Dorf - Bettmeralp
Fiesch - Fiescheralp - Eggishorn
Fürgangen - Bellwald
Erlenbach i.S. - Chrindi - Stockhorn
Lenk (Rotenbach) - Metsch
Gsteig - Lac de Sanetsch
Reusch - Oldenegg
Kandersteg - Allmenalp
Kandersteg - Sunnbüel (Gemmi)
Eisigbach (Frutigen) - Eisigenalp
Unter dem Birg (Adelboden) - Engstligenalp
Grindelwald - Pfingstegg
Wengen - Männlichen Luftseilbahn Wengen-Männlichen
Isenfluh - Sunnwald
Stechelberg - Mürren - Schilthorn
Mürren-Lauterbrunnen Bergbahn Lauterbrunnen–Mürren
Sörenberg Schönenboden - Brienzer Rothorn
Fräkmüntegg - Pilatus Kulm
Lungern - Turren
Distelboden (Melchsee-Frutt) - Bonistock
Engelberg - Brunni (Ristis)
Engelberg - Fürenalp
Trübsee - Stand - Klein Titlis
Fell (Oberrickenbach) - Chrüzhütte (Bannalp)
Fellboden (Oberrickenbach) - Bannalpsee
Dallenwil - Wirzweli
Dallenwil - Niederrickenbach
Stans-Kälti - Stanserhorn
Beckenried - Klewenalp
Emmetten - Niederbauen
Küssnacht am Rigi - Seebodenalp
Weggis - Rigi Kaltbad
Kräbel - Rigi Scheidegg
Brunnen - Urmiberg
Stoos - Fronalpstock
Morschach - Stoos
Sali (Bisisthal) - Glattalp
Illgau - Ried (Muotathal)
Brunni - Holzegg Pass
Weglosen - Seebli (Hoch-Ybrig)
Amsteg - Arnisee
St. Jakob - Gitschenen
Attinghausen (Ballweg) - Brüsti
Flüelen - Eggberge
Bürglen UR - Biel (Kinzig)
Schattdorf - Haldi
Bristen - Golzern
Andermatt - Gemsstock
Intschi - Arnisee
Airolo - Pesciüm
Pesciüm - Sasso della Boggia
Rodi - Lago Tremorgio
Arvigo - Braggio
Selma - Landarenca
Orselina - Cardada
Intragna - Costa
Verdascio - Rasa
San Carlo - Robiei
Brusino Arsizio - Serpiano
Luftseilbahn Adliswil-Felsenegg (LAF) Adliswil - Felsenegg
Jakobsbad - Kronenberg (Switzerland)
Schwägalp - Säntis
Wasserauen - Ebenalp
Brülisau - Hoher Kasten
Frümsen - Stauberen
Iltios - Chäserugg
Unterterzen - Tannbodenalp (Flumserberg)
Niederurnen - Morgenholz
Kies - Mettmen
Matt - Weissenberg (Switzerland)
 (Buochwald) Malans - Älpli
Fanas - Eggli
Klosters - Gotschnaboden - Gotschnagrat (Parsenn)
Weissfluhjoch - Weissfluhgipfel
Parsennhütte - Weissfluhjoch
Dörfji - Mitteltälli (Pischa)
Davos Platz - Ischalp - Jakobshorn
Chur - Känzeli
Naraus - Cassonsgrat
Laax - Crap Sogn Gion - Crap Masegn
Disentis - Caischavedra
Arosa - Weisshorn
Lenzerheide - Scharmoin - Parpaner Rothorn
Rhäzüns - Feldis/Veulden
Pranzaira - Albigna
Sils Maria - Furtschellas (Prasüra)
Surlej/Silvaplana - Murtèl - Corvatsch
St. Moritz Bad - Signal
Corviglia - Piz Nair
Bernina - Diavolezza
Curtinatsch - Piz Lagalb
Samnaun Ravaisch - Alp Trider Sattel
Rivera - Alpe Foppa

See also

List of funiculars in Switzerland
List of mountain railways in Switzerland
List of mountains of Switzerland accessible by public transport
Wetterhorn Elevator, defunct aerial tramway

 
Transport in Switzerland
Aerial tramways in Switzerland